Michał Mieszko Gogol (born 23 April 1985) is a Polish professional volleyball coach and former player. He currently serves as head coach for the Latvia national team.

References

External links
 
 Coach profile at Volleybox.net

1985 births
Living people
Sportspeople from Szczecin
Polish volleyball coaches
Polish expatriate sportspeople in Latvia
AZS Olsztyn coaches
Skra Bełchatów coaches